, several hundred trials of near-field communication have been conducted. Some firms have moved to full-scale service deployments, spanning either a single country or multiple countries.

Multi-country deployments include Orange's roll-out of NFC technology to banks, retailers, transport, and service providers in multiple European countries, and Airtel Africa and Oberthur Technologies deploying to 15 countries throughout Africa.

Africa

Kenya 

 Public transport: The Nairobi-based Citi Hoppa bus company has partnered with Beba to offer NFC enabled proximity cards for fare payments. Citi Hoppa staff use the Huawei Sonic NFC enabled phone to process these transactions.

Libya 

 Mobile payments: LPTIC, Al Madar, Libyana

South Africa 

 Public transport: Aconite, Proxema
 Mobile payments: Absa

Europe

Austria 

 Public transport: Mobilkom Austria (A1), ÖBB, Vienna Lines

Belgium 

 Mobile payments: Belgacom, Mobistar, Base
 Paper vouchers study: IBBT, Clear2Pay/Integri, Keyware, Accor Services

Croatia 

 Public transport (ZET, Zagreb)
 Payment (Erste Bank Croatia, MasterCard PayPass system)

Czech Republic 

 Mobile payments: Telefónica O2 Czech Republic, Komerční banka, Citibank Europe, Globus, Visa Europe, Baumax, Cinema City, Ikea
 NFC Access Control: IMA ltd. developed in 2009 a standalone access control system PATRON-PRO programmed by NFC enabled phone.

Denmark 

 Mobile payment vending machines: NFC & SMS payment, Coca-Cola and Microsoft, NFC Danmark.

France 

 Home healthcare: ADMR, Extelia, Inside Contactless, Abrapa
 Field service: Orange France
 Event ticketing: Stade de France, Orange
 Museum services: Centre Pompidou
 National NFC infrastructure: Paris, Bordeaux, Caen, Lille, Marseille, Rennes, Strasbourg, Toulouse, Nice, French Government
 Nice, Ville NFC: Gemalto, Oberthur Technologies, multi-bank (BNP Paribas, Crédit Agricole, Société Générale) with MasterCard, Visa Europe, Veolia Transport
 Loyalty programs: La Croissanterie, Rica Lewis, Game in Nice
 Public transport: Veolia Transport in Nice

Germany 

 Public transport (selected regions): VRR, RMV and Deutsche Bahn (combines the companies' previous HandyTicket and Touch & Travel programs)
 Mobile workforce management: ENAiKOON
 Mobile payment: Deutsche Telekom, Vodafone Germany, Telefónica 02 Germany
 Health insurance card: All public health insurance providers
 NFC-based Card Game

Hungary 

 Event ticketing: Sziget Festival, Vodafone Hungary

Ireland 

 Loyalty program: AIB Merchant Services (Allied Irish Bank, First Data), Zapa Technology

Italy 

 Mobile payment: Telecom Italia.
 Public transport: ATM (Milan), CAP autolinee (Prato).
 Contactless payment cards: Intesa Sanpaolo, MasterCard, Gemalto.
 Anti-counterfeiting: Tag Over.

Lithuania 

 Mobile payments: Mokipay

The Netherlands 

 Public transport: OV-chipkaart
 Commercial services: T-Mobile, Vodafone, KPN, Rabobank, ABN Amro, ING.
 Employee payments: Rabobank, Multicard

Norway 

 Airline Smart Pass: SAS Scandinavian Airlines introduces an NFC-based Smart Pass for frequent flyers, and the aviation industry's adoption of NFC is now truly underway.
Payments with MobilePay by Danske Bank.
Public transport tickets in most cities.

Poland 

 Mobile payments: Polkomtel, Bank Zachodni WBK; PTC, Inteligo; Orange, Bank Zachodni WBK

Romania 

 Public transport: Metrorex, RATT and RATB
 Guard patrol monitoring: nLogix

Russia 
 Public transport: Yekaterinburg Metro and MegaFon
 Public transport: Moscow Metro and Mobile TeleSystems

Slovenia 

 Mobile payments, marketing: Banka Koper, Cassis International, Inside Contactless, System Orga, Mobitel

Spain 

 Mobile shopping: Telefónica, Visa, La Caixa (Sitges)
 Public transport: Bankinter, Ericsson, Empresa Municipal de Transportes (Madrid); Vodafone, Entidad Publica del Transporte (Murcia)
 Event product payments: Mobile World Congress, GSMA, Telefónica, Visa, Samsung, Giesecke & Devrient, Ingenico, ITN International, La Caixa
 Employee payment, building access: Telefónica Espana, La Caixa, BBVA, Bankinter, Visa, Samsung, Oberthur, Autogrill, Giesecke & Devrient

Sweden 

 Airline Smart Pass: SAS Scandinavian Airlines introduces an NFC-based Smart Pass for frequent flyers, and the aviation industry's adoption of NFC is now truly underway.
 Hotel keys: Choice Hotels Scandinavia, Assa Abloy, TeliaSonera, VingCard Elsafe, Venyon (Stockholm)
 Transportation: Pay as you go in Southern Sweden with NFC enabled "Jojo cards"

Switzerland 

 Phone service kiosk: Sicap, Swisscom
 Mobile wallet

Turkey 

 Yapı ve Kredi Bankası and Turkcell, NFC is used on mobile payment all over Turkey with Yapı ve Kredi Bankası credit cards via mobile phones using Turkcell sim cards
 Mobile payments: Yapi Kredi, Turkcell, Wireless Dynamics; Avea, Garanti Bank, Gemalto
 Device testing: Visa Europe, Akbank

United Kingdom 

 Contactless payment: Transport for London
 Transport study: Department for Transport, Consult Hyperion
 Mobile payments: Waspit, Yates; Barclaycard and Everything Everywhere (Orange, T-Mobile)

North America

Canada 

 Contactless Payment Cards: MasterCard Paypass, Visa PayWave
 Mobile wallet: Tim Hortons TimmyME BlackBerry 10 Application; Zoompass, offered by Bell Mobility, Rogers and Telus (Enstream)
 Public Transit: Presto card, Compass Card (TransLink)
 TAPmeTAGS Opens In Canada: Offered by Synaptic Vision Inc.

United States 

 Device trial: Bank of America, Device Fidelity; US Bank, Device Fidelity, FIS, Montise
 Mobile payments: AT&T, Verizon, T-Mobile; Adirondack Trust; Community State Bank; Bankers Bank of the West; PayPal; Bank of America; US Bank; Wells Fargo; Blackboard; Google Wallet; Apple pay.
 Community Marketing and Business Rating: Google Places: Portland, OR; Austin, TX; Las Vegas, NV; Madison, WI; Charlotte, NC.
 Public transit: Visa, New York City Transit, NJ Transit, The Port Authority of New York and New Jersey, Chicago Transit Authority, LA Metro (Los Angeles, CA)

Asia

China 

 Mobile payments: China Unicom, Bank of Communications, China UnionPa
 Mobile transport ticketing: China Unicom

Hong Kong (China) 

 Contactless Payment/Public Transit: Octopus card

India 

 Mobile banking: A Little World; Citibank India
 Tata Docomo, MegaSoft XIUS (Hyderabad)
 PayMate have partnered Nokia to deploy NFC payment solution for mass market in India through Nokia NFC enabled handsets.
 Tagstand partnered with Paymate to deploy an NFC marketing campaign for Nokia and the movie Ra-One in priority partner stores across India.
 jusTap! has tied up with CineMAX to implement NFC campaign using nfc enabled smart posters at the movie theaters in Mumbai
jusTap! partners with Game4u to launch the first of its kind retail in‐store experience using NFC across India

Japan 

 Consumer services: Softbank Mobile, Credit Saison, Orient Corporation
 Consumer services: KDDI, Toyota, Orient Corporation, Credit Saison, Aiwa Card Services, MasterCard, Nomura Research Institute, All Nippon Airways, Japan Airlines, Toho Cinemas, Dai Nippon Printing, NTT Data, T-Engine, IBM, Japan Remote Control Co., Hitachi, Gemalto
 Consumer services: NTT Docomo and KT
 Social networking: Mixi

Malaysia 

 Clixster
 Maxis FastTap
 Touch n Go

Philippines 

 Consumer and commercial services: Jollibee Happyplus Card
 Xcite Republic: J Centre Mall

South Korea 

 Consumer and commercial services: KT solo and with NTT Docomo
 Cross-border services (with Japan): SK Telecom, KDDI, Softbank
 Mobile payment: SK Telecom, Hana SK Card
 Guided shopping: SK Telecom

Singapore 

 Mobile payments:MasterCard, DBS Bank, StarHub, EZ-Link, Gemalto

Sri Lanka 

 Public transport: Dialog Axiata
 Public transport: Mobitel
 Contactless Payment Cards: Hatton National Bank & AirtelDialog Axiata
 Contactless Payment Cards: Sampath Bank

Thailand 

 Mobile payments: Kasikorn Bank, AIS, Gemalto, AIS mPay Rabbit

Australasia

Australia 

 Mobile payments: m Payments Pty Ltd
 Contactless Micro Payment Cards: m Payments Pty Ltd
 Contactless Payment and Loyalty: m Payments Pty Ltd
 Mobile payments: Visa and ANZ Banking Group
 Mobile payments: PayPass and Facebook and Commonwealth Bank Australia by Commbank Kaching

New Zealand 

 Full real time Multi-Currency NFC system linked to New Zealand, Tonga, Australia, Fiji and Samoa, including BPay: (KlickEx, Digicel and Verifone)

Middle East

Israel 
 Rav Kav - An electronic ticket used in all public transportation companies over Israel. was first introduced in August 2007 by the Ministry of Transportation of the state of Israel, first offered on August 28, 2007 by Kavim bus company, and since January 2009 used as nationwide payment method in all public transportation companies, includes: all bus companies, Israel Railways and the Jerusalem Light Rail.
 The First NFC news&shop website

South America

Brazil 
 Mobile payments: Oi Paggo, Paggo from Oi, Germalto's Upteq N-Flex

See also 

 FeliCa
 MIFARE
 M-Pesa
 Near and far field
 Object hyperlinking
 Poken
 RFID
 RuBee
 Single Wire Protocol
 TransferJet
 Wii U GamePad

Notes

References

Further reading 
 Near Field Communication (NFC) Technology and Measurements

External links 
 A day at MIT with Near-Field Communication (vimeo.com)

Bandplans
Mobile telecommunications
Wireless
ISO standards
Ecma standards
Near-field communication
Communication-related lists